Hede is a locality situated in Härjedalen Municipality, Jämtland County, Sweden with 741 inhabitants in 2010. The river Ljusnan runs through the village. The forest around Hede have supported a number of  sawmills and paper mills. 
Sonfjället National Park and the Vemdalen ski resort are located a short distance from the village.
 

Hede is the site of Hede Church (Hede kyrka) and the parish of Hede in Diocese of Härnösand. The first wooden church was  built in 1613.
The present stone church was built in neo-Gothic style in 1890.  The church has whitewashed walls and is covered by  manor roofing that is clad with wood shavings. South of the church is a freestanding, wooden  onion dome bell tower built in 1751. The altarpiece was painted by Pehr Sundin (1760–1827). The pulpit was carved by Jöns Ljungberg (1736–1818).

References 

Populated places in Härjedalen Municipality
Härjedalen